Nayyar Ali Dada (born 11 November 1943) is a Pakistani architect.

Early life and education
Nayyar Ali Dada was born on 11 November 1943 in Delhi, British India, to a Punjabi Muslim Sayyid family. His family migrated to Lahore, Pakistan in the 1950s. After finishing his basic education at the University of Punjab, Lahore in 1957, he enrolled in the National College of Arts (NCA), Lahore as a student. In 1964, he graduated from NCA but chose to remain attached with it by working there as a teacher. The principal of NCA Shakir Ali and Dada became friends. According to Overseas Pakistanis Foundation website, "The relationship with Shakir Ali (the principal of NCA) grew, and the two became close friends. As a token of friendship, Nayyar designed Shakir Ali's house in Garden Town, Lahore (now the Shakir Ali Museum)."

Works
Buildings associated with Dada include:
 Shakir Ali Museum (Lahore) 1982
 Grand Jamia Mosque, Lahore Bahria Town
 Grand Jamia Mosque, Karachi Bahria Town
 Alhamra Arts Council, Lahore in 1981
 BCCI Bank (Colombo, Sri Lanka)
 Beaconhouse National University, Tarogil Campus (Lahore)
 Faisalabad Arts Council
 Gaddafi Stadium (Lahore)
 Serena Hotel (Islamabad)
 Bagh-e-Jinnah, Lahore (restored the historic garden)
Shaukat Khanum Memorial Cancer Hospital & Research Centre
 Vogue Towers (a shopping mall in Lahore, Pakistan) (2010)
 Lahore Zoo
 Quaid-e-Azam Library, (Lahore)
 The Defence Revelation, (Lahore)

Awards and recognition
 Pride of Performance Award by the Government of Pakistan in 1992
 Aga Khan Award for Architecture in 1998
 Sitara-i-Imtiaz (Star of Excellence) Award by the President of Pakistan in 2003
 Hilal-i-Imtiaz (Crescent of Excellence) Award by the President of Pakistan in 2018

References

External links
 
 
 

1943 births
Living people
21st-century Pakistani architects
Muhajir people
University of the Punjab alumni
National College of Arts alumni
Recipients of the Pride of Performance
People from Lahore
Academic staff of Beaconhouse National University
 
Recipients of Sitara-i-Imtiaz
Recipients of Hilal-i-Imtiaz